Albert E. Todd (August 5, 1878 – October 26, 1928) served as mayor of Victoria, British Columbia Canada from 1917 to 1919.  He was seen as a visionary whose impact was felt both during his term and after. He was born to Jacob Hunter Todd and Rosanna Wigley in 1878.

One of the first licensed drivers in the city, he was keen on promoting the city as a tourist destination and making it easier to get around town.

During his time in office he envisioned a crossing over the harbour to the west side (which later became the Johnson Street Bridge), saw through the installation of the now iconic cluster of street lights around the downtown area and promoted the Malahat Drive. He died at the age of 50 in 1928.

References 

Mayors of Victoria, British Columbia
1878 births
1928 deaths